European Film Award for Best Production Designer is an award category in the European Film Awards. The category was first presented in 1990 being award to both art directors and costume designers. At the 1st European Film Awards in 1988, two art directors were nominated Special Aspect Award with Sergej Paradshanow winning the award for Ashik Kerib. 

Though the category was not presented from 2006 to 2009, four production designers received nominations for special awards with Pierre Pell and Stéphane Rozenbaum winning the Award for an Artistic Contribution for The Science of Sleep in 2006 and Uli Hanisch receiving the Prix d'Excellence for Perfume: The Story of a Murderer in 2007. A set of nominees was presented in 2005 and from 2010 to 2012, since 2013 only a winner is presented without nominees.

Winners and nominees
The winners are in a yellow background and in bold.

1980s

1990s

2000s

2010s

2020s

References

External links
European Film Academy archive

Production Designer
Awards for best art direction